Padogobius nigricans, the Arno goby, is a species of goby endemic to Italy.  It occurs in streams, staying to well-vegetated edge areas.  Males of this species reach a length of  TL while the females only reach  TL.

References

Padogobius
Freshwater fish of Europe
Endemic fauna of Italy
Fish described in 1867
Taxonomy articles created by Polbot
Taxobox binomials not recognized by IUCN